Abraham Jacobus Wendel (Leiden, 31 October 1826  Leiden, 23 September 1915) was a Dutch lithographer, draughtsman and scientific botanical and paleontological illustrator using the signature AW and A. J. Wendel

Life and work 
Abraham Jacobus Wendel was born in 1826 in Leiden, the son of Jacobus Cornelis Wendel (1796-1860) and Johanna Vegt (1801-1869). In 1849 he married Jannetje Koolen (1826-1904) and had six children, including Abraham Jacobus Johannes Wendel (Leiden, 9 July 1854 - 3 April 1930), who became a lithographer and botanical artist in his own right, using signature AJJW. His father Abraham Jacobus Wendel created the botanical illustrations  for many books and scientific journal articles. He was a lithographer with the printing house Arntz & Co. in Leiden, and made the illustrations for W. H. De Vriese et al. Descriptions et figures des plantes nouvelles et rares (1847). In 1887 he worked with Boek- en steendrukkerij P.W.M. Trap in Leiden: both Wendel and Trap are acknowledged in volumes 6 and 7 of the Annales du Jardin botanique de Buitenzorg (Ann.Jard.Bot.Btzg.).

Publications

Books 
Botanical and paleontological art, including:
 1847: , ;  - Descriptions et figures des plantes nouvelles et rares : du Jardin Botanique de l'Université de Leide et des principaux jardins du royaume des Pays-Bas
 1858:  - Flora Javae et insularum adjacentium
 [1868]:  and  - Flora : afbeeldingen en beschrijvingen van boomen, heesters, éénjarige planten, enz., voorkomende in de Nederlandsche tuinen. Groningen: Wolters.
 1879: ,  et al. - Nederlandsche Flora en Pomona, beschreven en uitgegeven door het bestuur der Pomologische Vereeniging te Boskoop. (Redactie: K.J.W. Ottolander, A. Koster, C. de Vos.) Met platen naar de natuur geteekend door A.J. Wendel. Groningen: Wolters.
  [187-]: Prentenboek / Adelborst., Leiden: D. Noothoven Van Goor
 1894:  - Pithecanthropus erectus: eine menschenähnliche Übergangsform aus Java.  Batavia: Landesdruckerei., collaboration with his son Abraham Jacobus Johannes?

Portraits 
 1855: portrait van Antonius Niermeyer, university professor at Leiden University

Maps 
 [1900]: Kaart van Zuid-Afrika (Map of Boer War South Africa) in F. Lion Cachet: De worstelstrijd der Transvalers [1900]

Gallery

Footnote

1826 births
1915 deaths
Botanical illustrators
Dutch lithographers
Scientific illustrators
People from Leiden